The South Congregational Church is a historic church at 90 Main Street in New Britain, Connecticut.  It is a large brownstone Gothic Revival structure, located at a central intersection in the city's heart.  The church was built in 1865, with the parish house added in 1889.  Both were designed by the noted Boston architect George F. Meacham.  The congregation was established in 1842, and was merged with First Baptist Church in 1974.  The building was listed on the National Register of Historic Places in 1990.

Architecture and history
The South Congregational Church occupies a prominent position in downtown New Britain, occupying a triangular parcel bounded on the west by Arch Street and Main Street on the east. It is a long rectangular structure, built out of brownstone, with a tower at the northwest corner and the parish house attached at the southeast corner. It is covered by a steep gabled roof, with a band of clerestory windows between the central main roof and that over the side aisles. The walls have Gothic buttressing, and windows are generally lancet-arched in the Gothic style. The attached parish house, built four years after the church, also exhibits Gothic features.

The South Church congregation was founded in 1842 and grew rapidly as the city's industrial base expanded.  This church was built in 1865 to a design by Boston architect George F. Meacham, who was already known for his institutional designs.  The parish house was added in 1889, also designed by Meacham.  The church was a mainstay and welcoming influence to the city's immigrant communities, providing outreach services to a variety of ethnicities.  The congregation merged with a Baptist congregation in 1974.

See also
National Register of Historic Places listings in Hartford County, Connecticut

References

External links
South Congregational First Baptist Church web site

United Church of Christ churches in Connecticut
Churches on the National Register of Historic Places in Connecticut
Gothic Revival church buildings in Connecticut
Churches completed in 1865
19th-century United Church of Christ church buildings
Churches in Hartford County, Connecticut
Buildings and structures in New Britain, Connecticut
National Register of Historic Places in Hartford County, Connecticut